Cacciatore is an Italian surname. Notable people with the surname include:

Fabrizio Cacciatore (born 1986), Italian footballer
Frank Cacciatore (born 1955), American baseball player, coach and manager
Jeff Cacciatore (born 1958), American soccer player
Lorena Cacciatore (born 1987), Italian actress
Luigi Cacciatore (1900–1951), Italian politician
Niccolò Cacciatore (1770–1841), Italian astronomer
Osvaldo Cacciatore (1924–2007), Argentine Air Force brigadier
Steve Cacciatore (born 1954), American soccer player

Other
Benedetto Santapaola (born 1938), mafioso from Catania, his nickname is il cacciatore
Sampson "Sammy" Cacciatore and Mary Jo Cacciatore, characters from Blue Mountain State
Mike "Mooch" Cacciatore, character from Wiseguy (TV series)

See also

Cacciatore (disambiguation)
Cacciatore
Cacciatori (surname)

Italian-language surnames